Live Forever: September 23, 1980 • Stanley Theatre • Pittsburgh, PA is a live album by Bob Marley & The Wailers released in February 2011, recorded at Pittsburgh's Stanley Theatre during the Uprising Tour to support their, then, latest album of the same name.

Overview
This was Marley's last concert before his death in 1981. "Get Up Stand Up", Bob Marley's last performed song, was not found until 2000 by Bob Marley Archivists James Wilson and Jack Low. The taper at the show was on the balcony and had 2 tapes for the show. The original soundboard tape was cut during the song "Work" due to it only being a 90-minute tape.

Track listing
Disc one
Greetings – 0:31
"Natural Mystic" – 4:40
"Positive Vibration" – 4:47
"Burnin' and Lootin'" – 3:35
"Them Belly Full (But We Hungry)" – 3:47
"The Heathen" – 4:25
"Running Away" – 2:50
"Crazy Baldhead" – 5:02
"War" / "No More Trouble" – 6:03
"Zimbabwe" – 3:39
"Zion Train" – 3:50
"No Woman, No Cry" – 6:05

Disc two
"Jamming" – 4:31
"Exodus" – 7:01
"Redemption Song" – 4:07
"Coming in from the Cold" – 3:37
"Could You Be Loved" – 7:40
"Is This Love" – 3:37
"Work" – 4:15
"Get Up, Stand Up" – 6:38

Personnel
Bob Marley – vocals, guitar
Carlton Barrett – drums
Aston "Family Man" Barrett – bass guitar
Junior Marvin – lead guitar
Al Anderson – lead guitar
Alvin "Seeco" Patterson – percussion
Ian Winters – keyboards
Tyrone Downie – keyboards
"The I Threes": Judy Mowatt, Marcia Griffiths, Rita Marley – backing vocals

Personnel
UMe A&R: Jamie Feldman and Harry Weinger
Mastered by Kevin Reeves at Universal Mastering Studios-East
Production Manager: Shannon Steckloff
UMe Business Affairs: Beatriz Pace
Product Manager: Adam Starr 
Special thanks to: Rita Marley, Cedella Marley, Ziggy Marley, and the Marley family.

References

2011 live albums
Bob Marley and the Wailers live albums